Serba Peak is a prominent rock peak (830 m) that surmounts the ridge along the north side of Fergusson Glacier, in the Wilson Hills. Mapped by United States Geological Survey (USGS) from surveys and U.S. Navy air photos, 1960–63. Named by Advisory Committee on Antarctic Names (US-ACAN) for Lieutenant Edward W. Serba, U.S. Navy, Navigator in LC-130F Hercules aircraft during Operation Deep Freeze 1967 and 1968.

Mountains of Oates Land